Carol A. Baltosiewich is a nurse and former member of the Hospital Sisters of St. Francis noted for her work with HIV/AIDS patients. She is from Belleville, Illinois.

Life
In the 1980s, Baltosiewich was assigned to care for a young gay man dying of AIDS in rural Illinois. Knowing little about AIDS or the gay culture, she convinced her superiors to send her and another sister to Saint Vincent's Catholic Medical Center in Greenwich Village New York, a hospital known for their work with both gay and AIDS patients. They also worked at Saint Clare's Hospital in Hell's Kitchen, an institution that served a large homeless and indigent population. She lived in a convent in Hell's Kitchen during her time in New York. While there, she visited gay bars, worked on a hotline for those with questions about HIV, and volunteered with the Gay Men's Health Crisis.

As part of her ministry, Baltosiewich held the hands of AIDS patients while they died, sometimes when their own families were too afraid to be in the same room as them. She stayed overnight in homes set up for AIDS patients as part of the Good Samaritan Project. In 1988, Baltosiewich founded Bethany Place in Belleville to provide services for those with HIV and AIDS.

She later left her religious order. Baltosiewich also served on a state AIDS commission.

References

Year of birth missing (living people)
People from Belleville, Illinois
Third Order Regular Franciscans
American women nurses
HIV/AIDS activists
Living people
21st-century American Roman Catholic religious sisters
Former Roman Catholic religious sisters and nuns
20th-century Roman Catholic sisters
American Roman Catholic sisters